Ross Martin (born July 3, 1993) is an American football placekicker who is currently a free agent. He played college football at Duke and holds a school record for most field goals (78), extra points (196), and total points (430). Martin made 83% of his collegiate field goal attempts.

College career

2012 
At the end of the 2012 season, Martin totaled 106 points on 20-of-23 (.870) field goals and 46-of-47 (.979) PATs. Martin kicked a career-high 4 field goals, and scored a career-high 14 points against North Carolina. Martin kicked a season-high 6 PATs against North Carolina Central.

2013 
At the end of the 2013 season, Martin totaled 97 points on 13-of-19 (68.4%) field goals and 58-of-58 PATs. Martin kicked a career-high 7 PATs against Pittsburgh. Martin scored a season-high 12 points against Miami.

2014 
At the end of the 2014 season, Martin compiled 107 points on 19-of-21 (90.5%) field goals and 50-of-50 PATs. In the ACC, Martin ranked first in field goal percentage, and tied for first in PAT percentage. Martin kicked a season-high 7 PATs against Elon. Martin scored a season-high 11 points against Kansas. Martin kicked a season-high 3 field goals against Virginia Tech.

2015 
At the end of the 2015 season, Martin totaled 120 points on 26-of-30 (86.7%) field goals and 42-of-42 PATs. Martin kicked a season-high 7 PATs against North Carolina Central. Martin scored a season-high 14 points against Army. Martin kicked a season-high 3 field goals against Tulane.

Professional career

New York Jets 
On April 30, 2016, after going undrafted in the 2016 NFL Draft, Martin signed with the New York Jets. He was released on August 28, 2016. He signed a reserve/future contract with the Jets on January 4, 2017.

On September 1, 2017, Martin was waived by the Jets.

Cleveland Browns
On June 14, 2018, Martin signed with the Cleveland Browns. He was released on August 28, 2018.

References 

1993 births
Living people
Duke Blue Devils football players
New York Jets players
Cleveland Browns players
American football placekickers